Pedro Alberto Delgado Hernández (born October 1, 1956) is a United States district judge of the United States District Court for the District of Puerto Rico.

Biography

Delgado Hernández was born on October 1, 1956 in San Juan, Puerto Rico. He received a Bachelor of Science degree in 1979, from the University of Puerto Rico. He received a Juris Doctor, magna cum laude, in 1983, from the University of Puerto Rico School of Law. He began his legal career as a law clerk with the Puerto Rican Institute of Judicial Studies and then as a law clerk to Judge Juan Torruella, first at the United States District Court for the District of Puerto Rico and then at the United States Court of Appeals for the First Circuit. Served the United States Army Reserve, from 1979-1985. From 1986 to 1993, he worked at the law firm of O'Neill & Borges LLC. From 1993 to 1995, he served as Solicitor General of Puerto Rico. From 1995 to 1996, he served as a Judge on the Puerto Rico Court of Appeals. Between 1996 and 2014, he returned as a partner to the O'Neill & Borges LLC law firm, where he handled civil litigation in both State and Federal courts.

Federal judicial service

On June 26, 2013, President Barack Obama nominated Delgado Hernández to serve as a United States District Judge of the United States District Court for the District of Puerto Rico, to the seat vacated by Judge Daniel R. Dominguez, who retired on July 31, 2011. On March 5, 2014 the United States Senate invoked cloture on his nomination by a 57–41 vote with 1 Senator (John Cornyn) voted 'present'. His nomination was confirmed later that day by a 98–0 vote. He received his commission on March 7, 2014.

See also

List of Hispanic/Latino American jurists
List of Puerto Ricans

References

External links

1956 births
Living people
Hispanic and Latino American judges
Judges of the United States District Court for the District of Puerto Rico
People from San Juan, Puerto Rico
Puerto Rican lawyers
United States Army reservists
United States district court judges appointed by Barack Obama
University of Puerto Rico alumni
21st-century American judges